Mulkalapalle, Mulakalapalli or Mulakalapally is a mandal in Bhadradri Kothagudem district of Telangana, India.

Palwancha is the nearest town from this village. This village is 16 km away from Palwancha.

Geography 
The district is spread over an area of 1,084 square kilometres (419 sq mi). It is situated 505 metres above sea level. The landmark consists of rocky terrain and monolithic rocks in the outskirts of the city.

Demographics
According to Indian census 2011,

Gram panchayats in Mulkalpally

Government offices in Mulkalpally 
 Mandal Praja Parishad Office
 Mandal Revenue Office
 Police Station
 Govt School
 Govt Intermediate College

References

Mandals in Bhadradri Kothagudem district